The European Geoparks Network (EGN) functions as the regional organization of the Global Geoparks Network (GGN) and the UNESCO International Geosciences and Geoparks Programme (UNESCO-IGGP). Its main objective is to ensure cooperation between geoparks for the protection of geological heritage and the promotion of sustainable development of their territories in Europe. In 2020 January, the EGN had 75 institutional members (UNESCO Global Geoparks) from 26 European countries and there are several aspiring geopark projects, applying for a UNESCO label and therefore the permanent EGN membership.

History 
The 1990s are widely considered as the birth of geoheritage as a dedicated domain of the geosciences, dealing with the preservation and valorisation of the Earth's abiotical heritage, its geodiversity. The idea of coordinated work on geology-focused territorial frameworks in Europe was discussed during the International Geological Congress in Beijing, 1997. After preparatory meetings in 1999, four European territories assembled in Lesvos, between 3–5 June 2000:

 Réserve Géologique de Haute-Provence – France
 Natural History Museum of Lesvos Petrified Forest – Greece (Lesvos)
 Geopark Gerolstein/Vulkaneifel – Germany
 Maestrazgo Cultural Park – Spain

They signed the convention on the establishment of the European Geoparks Label and the Network itself, with the intention of sharing information and expertise, as well as defining common tools.

On 20 April 2001, during the 3rd EGN Coordination Meeting, the Convention of Cooperation was signed between UNESCO Division of Earth Sciences and the EGN at Parc Cabo de Gata in Spain, defining the basis of the partnership between the two signatories.

In February 2004 the Global Geoparks Network (GGN) was founded in Paris by the members of EGN and the Chinese Geopark Network. The international partnership was developed under the umbrella of UNESCO and in October 2004 the Madonie Declaration was issued during the 5th Annual Meeting of EGN. It recognized the EGN as the official branch of the UNESCO – Global Geoparks Network in Europe. The declaration also underlines that EGN serves as a reference for the creation of similar continental networks of geoparks worldwide.

From March 2015 (35th European Geoparks Meeting, Paris, France), EGN continued as the regional geopark network of GGN. In November 2015, the 38th UNESCO General Conference adopted the International Geosciences and Geoparks Programme, officially approving the geopark concept to its framework and merging it with the existing International Geoscience Programme. The UNESCO Global Geopark label was created and all institutional members of EGN received it automatically.

Organization 
The EGN operates under the auspices of the Statutes of the Global Geoparks Network, supplemented with the Rules of Operation of EGN, based on the Charter of EGN, signed in 2000. Its headquarters are located in the Haute-Provence UNESCO Global Geopark in Digne-les-Bains, France.

The members of EGN consist of:

 the institutional members: all the UNESCO Global Geoparks and regional members of GGN in Europe.
 individual members: professionals of GGN in Europe, dealing with geopark management
 honorary members: people who have committed extraordinary service to the geopark concept
 cooperating members: international organizations, institutions or people providing financial or other assistance to the EGN

National geoparks committees / forums 
In several European countries, national geopark networks were founded after the decision of the Coordination Committee of EGN in 2007. They function as the forums to enhance the cooperation of geoparks and the promotion of the geopark concept on a national level and taking over directly selected activities of EGN / GGN in a country.

As of 2020, the following national committees / forums exist.

 Austrian Geoparks Forum
 Czech Geoparks Forum
 French Geoparks Forum
 Finnish Geoparks Forum
 German Geoparks Forum
 Hellenic Geoparks Forum
 Icelandic Geoparks Forum
 Irish Geoparks Forum
 Italian Geoparks Forum
 Netherlands Geopark Forum
 Norwegian National Committee for Geoheritage and Geoparks
 Portuguese Geoparks Forum
 Slovenian Geopark Forum
 Spanish Geoparks Forum
 UK Geoparks Forum

Members

Former members 

(at 18 April 2018):
 Abberley and Malvern Hills Geopark (England, UK)
 Astrobleme, Rochechouart (France)
 Kamptal Geopark (Austria)
 Lochaber Geopark (Scotland, UK)
 Mecklenburg Ice-age Landscape Geopark (Germany)

Meetings and activities 
The executive decisions and operative work of EGN take place within the half-year coordination meetings, hosted every spring and autumn by one of the institutional members. The six-monthly coordination meetings of the autumn periods run parallel with the Annual Meetings (2000–2012) and European Geoparks Conferences, now organized every two years. These are open to non-institutional and non-individual EGN members as well, functioning as venues of scientific exchange and networking opportunity, related to the geoparks concept.

See also
Geopark
Geotourism
Global Geoparks Network
Asia Pacific Geoparks Network
Latin America and the Caribbean Geoparks Network
African Geoparks Network

References

External links 
European Geoparks Network (Accessed: 27 February 2020)

Geopark networks
Geoparks in Europe